Varnado is an Americanized form of the Greek surname Vernadakis. It is rarely found as a given name. Notable people with the name include:

 Jarvis Varnado (born 1988), American basketball player
 Victor Varnado (born 1969), American comedian and actor
 Varnado Simpson (1948–1997), United States Army soldier and mass murderer

See also
 Mercedes Kaestner-Varnado (born 1992), American professional wrestler known as Sasha Banks
Varnado, Louisiana, a village in the United States